Indiana Jones and the Infernal Machine is an action-adventure video game by LucasArts released in 1999. The first 3D installment in the series, its gameplay focuses on solving puzzles, fighting enemies, and completing various platforming sections. The story is set in 1947, after the events of Indiana Jones and the Iron Phoenix, and puts the eponymous protagonist, the adventurer Indiana Jones, against the Soviet Union. In a race for a mythological Babylonian power source, he joins forces with the Central Intelligence Agency and collects four pieces of the Infernal Machine, an ancient device that allegedly opens a portal to another dimension.

The title was designed, written, and directed by Hal Barwood, who considered the Indiana Jones franchise a perfect fit for the action-adventure genre. Initially developed for the Microsoft Windows operating systems, the game later received an enhanced Nintendo 64 port jointly developed with Factor 5 released exclusively in North America, as well as a 2D version for the Game Boy Color created by HotGen. Infernal Machine received generally favorable reviews, having been praised for its detailed storyline and sophisticated level designs, though widely criticized for its unwieldy control scheme.

Gameplay

Infernal Machine is an action-adventure and, as such, features a hybrid of various gameplay mechanics. The player sees Indiana Jones from a third-person perspective and controls him through 17 levels of a fully polygonal 3D world. A recurring element of Infernal Machine are platforming sections, for which a combination of running, jumping, climbing, and the use of the protagonist's trademark bullwhip is required. Furthermore, several human, animal and supernatural enemies are encountered during the course of the game, which the player can fight off with numerous firearms, the aforementioned whip, and a machete. In addition to these obstacles, the game largely focuses on solving puzzles and discovering treasures. Some levels include vehicle-themed portions such as rafting, jeep treks, and mine cart chases. The main objective of the game is to collect four machine parts in order to complete the titular Infernal Machine.

Plot
The story of the game is set in 1947 and depicts archaeologist and adventurer Indiana Jones returning to his digging career after his involvement in World War II. Sophia Hapgood, an old friend of Jones and a member of the Central Intelligence Agency, visits him at his dig site in the Canyonlands, and informs him that the Soviets are excavating the ruins of Babylon. Led by Dr. Gennadi Volodnikov, a physicist interested in alternate dimensions, the Soviets' objective is to find a weapon more powerful than the nuclear bomb, giving them a decisive advantage in the Cold War.

Sophia hires Jones to investigate what exactly the Soviets are searching for, and he travels to their dig site in the Kingdom of Iraq. There, he joins up with Sophia's boss Simon Turner and finds out that Volodnikov is looking for the Babylonian god Marduk who lives on another plane called the Aetherium. Deep in the ruins of the Etemenanki, Jones translates ancient cuneiform tablets revealing the true story behind the Tower of Babel: 2600 years ago, Nebuchadnezzar II was inspired by Marduk to build a great engine, but the frightened Babylonians tore the tower housing it down, leading four of the god's disciples to escape with some parts of this "Infernal Machine".

Jones embarks on a journey to find the four machine parts before the Soviets do, and retrieves them from a monastery in the mountains of the Kazakh Soviet Socialist Republic, an active volcano on Palawan in the Philippines, an Olmec valley in Mexico, and a tomb near Meroë in the deserts of the Anglo-Egyptian Sudan. He is confronted by Volodnikov and Turner who both demand him to hand over the parts as they think they would not be safe with the other side. Untrusting of his fellow Americans, but opting for the lesser evil, he gives the parts to Sophia and Turner. Volodnikov says that it was probably better this way, as Marduk would have his revenge on those who desecrated the machine.

Alarmed, Jones returns to the Room of the Tablets in Babylon, and finds a now-opened gate leading further into the ruins, to the core of the Infernal Machine. He catches up with Sophia and Turner, the latter of which intends to convince the other dimension to cooperate with the United States, and uses the machine parts to activate the engine. Turner pushes the unwilling Sophia into a mystical cage as a means of sending her to the Aetherium as an ambassador. Jones sees no other way but to kill him to reclaim all parts and rescue her. However, the activated machine goes awry, and Jones and Sophia are sucked into a portal that leads to the other dimension. There, he defeats the malevolent Marduk and frees Sophia from her cage. Having escaped back to Babylon, the team is greeted by Volodnikov, who is curious to find out if they encountered God on the other side, which Jones denies. In the ensuing conversation, the Soviet doctor turns out less extremist than assumed, and the three wander off into the sunrise in search of a good bottle of vodka. A bonus level sees Jones return to the Peruvian temple from the opening of the film Raiders of the Lost Ark, discovering another golden idol in a secret room.

Development

Infernal Machine project leader, designer and writer Hal Barwood always thought of Indiana Jones as an action hero. Based on this notion, he decided for the game to be an action-adventure, as he was particularly fond of the genre and its use of 3D worlds. Barwood also considered the Nazis to be overused as villains in the series and so instead set the title in the Cold War era with Russians as the antagonists. Originally, UFOs were planned to be used as a plot device, though George Lucas vetoed the idea, still reserving it for a then undeveloped fourth installment. In lieu thereof, Barwood became interested in ancient technology like the Antikythera mechanism, conceived the Infernal Machine as the MacGuffin, and placed it in the biblical Tower of Babel, which is believed to be identical with the Etemenanki, a temple dedicated to the god Marduk.

Developed for Windows 95 and 98, the game uses a modified version of the Sith engine adapted for a third-person view by lead programmer Paul LeFevre. Eventually, lighting, collision, rendering and tools underwent drastic rewrites to the point that the code was renamed the Jones engine. The levels were principally designed by Steven Chen, and later conceptualized with illustrations by lead artist William Tiller. Multiplayer support was planned at the beginning of the development, but ultimately dropped because it turned out to be too complex to adequately test. Instead, more emphasis was put on the design of the single-player campaign with its puzzles and exploring aspect. The team implemented a hint system to lead players in the right direction. Additionally, the score system from previous Indiana Jones games, the Indy Quotient, makes a return. Apart from John Williams' "Raiders March", the soundtrack was newly composed by Clint Bajakian and consists of about 130 original pieces. Dubbed European language versions of the fully voice-acted game were released by THQ in Germany, Ubisoft in France, Electronic Arts in Spain and CTO in Italy.

An intended PlayStation version was canceled early after the game's announcement. However, a team of eight Factor 5 employees teamed up with artists, level designers and a programmer from LucasArts to port Infernal Machine to the Nintendo 64. Development of this version commenced in early March 1999 and was finished in October 2000. Over the course of these 19 months, several improvements were made to the game, such as enhanced real-time lighting, controls, camera and particle systems, as well as added lock-on targeting and assigning items to three of the C buttons of the Nintendo 64 controller. Furthermore, the N64 version has some new musical pieces composed by Chris Hülsbeck, and employs sequenced music as opposed to the prerecorded audio from the PC original. The port was only released in North America and was exclusive to the LucasArts Company Store, a majority of the stock being distributed for rental at the Blockbuster chain of stores. Electronic Arts planned to release it in Europe, but the title then saw a change of publisher to THQ. Originally scheduled for March 2001, the PAL version became subject to continuous monthly delays and was eventually canceled in September 2001. A 2D version of Infernal Machine with top-down perspective gameplay was developed for the Game Boy Color by HotGen also in early 2001.

In October 2018, GOG.com re-released Indiana Jones and the Infernal Machine as a downloadable game for personal computers. In November, the game was released through Steam.

Reception

The PC version of Infernal Machine received generally favorable reviews with an average score of 73.60 percent at GameRankings. Although some critics found it to be too similar to Tomb Raider, the game was noted for setting itself apart from the aforementioned series due to being based on the Indiana Jones franchise, and relying more heavily on puzzle-solving. IGN commended the game for its intricate and intriguing storyline. Eurogamer shared the opinion and stated the plot to be "excellently woven", enhancing the feel of "being part of a big blockbuster movie". Computer and Video Games, Eurogamer, and IGN also praised Infernal Machine for its levels, calling them "excellently designed" and including "some of the most brilliant layouts [...] seen in a game of this type". While IGN thought the variety of puzzles provided was sufficient and applauded the inclusion of a hint system, GameSpot found many of the puzzles in the game to focus too heavily on platforming and went on to state that they become "quite repetitive - even predictable" after the first few levels. The most criticized aspect of the PC game across the majority of reviews, however, are the controls. Eurogamer described them as "infuriating at times", mostly due to their faulty collision detection when performing certain actions. GameSpot thought the control system was too jerky, unresponsive, and unnecessarily slow because of delays between the moves.

Tom Russo reviewed the PC version of the game for Next Generation, rating it three stars out of five.

The graphics, while low on polygons, were received well for its detailed textures and the diverse locations presented. Eurogamer called Infernal Machine "one of the best looking third person adventures", and applauded the in-engine cutscenes, claiming them to be "bordering on film quality at times". GameSpot said the graphics were "not exactly cutting edge", but "generally quite good" due to the "fairly smooth and convincing" animations. IGN praised the environments for having "a lot more personality than the Tomb Raider series". Eurogamer called some of the locations "simply stunning", and GameSpot found the levels to be "aesthetically well designed because of convincing architecture and wall decorations". Furthermore, the soundtrack was stated by IGN to be "one of the best features of the game", based on its adding to the dramatic impact along the way. They applauded the voice recording for being "crisp and clean", though were disappointed with the sparsity of musical tracks and environmental sound effects. Allgame was impressed with the weapon effects and the foreign-language voice overs for the Soviet soldiers, while Computer and Video Games considered the lack of Harrison Ford as Indiana Jones' voice disappointing, though understandable given his high salary. Eurogamer found the comments of the playable character to become annoying after a while, but were impressed with the ambient sounds and music, claiming the latter to be "ace stuff", "further enhancing the motion picture feeling of the game".

Despite its enhancements, the Nintendo 64 version fared about as well with critics as the PC original, yielding 70.99 percent at GameRankings and a Metacritic score of 75 out of 100 points. The control scheme of the port was well received by IGN for the addition of C button item management and Z-targeting, both inspired by Ocarina of Time. Though they still considered the controls "slow" and "a little clunky", they commended them for being "more intuitive, tighter, speedier, and all around more balanced" than those of the PC version. GameSpot did not share these sentiments and stated the adaption of the keyboard controls to the console controller to be "rather clunky and unintuitive". IGN was impressed with the texture work and lighting, and found the title to be "one of the prettiest" on the Nintendo 64, even more so by employing the Expansion Pak to achieve high-resolution graphics. Despite its praise, the graphics received criticism for its "wooden" character animations, occasional frame rate drops, and bugs such as pop-ups and faulty texture placement. IGN remarked that the sound was superior to the PC version's, while GameSpot thought it was about on par with the port's above-average graphics. Additionally, GameSpot criticized the Nintendo 64 version for the many bugs and lockups, a problem uncommon for console releases.

HotGen's Game Boy Color version received an average score of 73.80 percent at GameRankings. It was panned by GameSpot for its backtracking, missing puzzle hints, and lack of plot development, but lauded for its clean animations and sound effects. Allgame was disappointed with the instruction manual being mandatory to understand the game's mostly non-existent plot, and criticized the decision to make the player restart a level upon dying, as well as the password system, calling it "annoying". Nintendo Power compared it to the N64 version saying it that it has much depth and far fewer control problems, and described it more as a puzzle game.

Further reading

References

External links
  (via Internet Archive)
 

1999 video games
Action-adventure games
Video games about ancient astronauts
Cancelled PlayStation (console) games
Game Boy Color games
Infernal Machine
Nintendo 64 games
LucasArts games
THQ games
Sith (game engine) games
Video game sequels
Video games scored by Clint Bajakian
Video games set in 1947
Video games set in Africa
Video games set in Iraq
Video games set in Kazakhstan
Video games set in Mexico
Video games set in Peru
Video games set in the Philippines
Video games set in Sudan
Video games set in the United States
Video games set in Utah
Windows games
Cold War video games
Video games set in the Soviet Union
Factor 5 games
Single-player video games
Video games developed in the United States
HotGen games